The Night Before Christmas, also known as Evenings on a Farm near Dikanka, is a 1961 Soviet fantasy film directed by Aleksandr Rou, based on a "Christmas Eve", first story in the second volume of the 1832 collection Evenings on a Farm Near Dikanka by Nikolai Gogol.

Plot 
This eccentric and fantastical fairy tale takes place near the village of Dikanka on the night before Christmas. Amid carol singing, drunken revelry, and amorous hijinks, the blacksmith Vakula persuades the Devil to fly him to Sankt-Petersburg, where he hopes to obtain a pair of the Empress's heels which might win him Oksana's love.

Cast 
Aleksandr Khvylya as Chub
Lyudmyla Myznikova as Oksana
Yuri Tavrov as Vakula
Lyudmila Khityaeva as Solokha
Sergei Martinson as Osip, the Sacristan
Anatoly Kubatsky as Panas
Vera Altayskaya as Wife of Panas
Dmitri Kapka as Shanuvalenko
Mykola Yakovchenko as Patsyuk
Maryna Sidorchuk as Odarka
Aleksandr Radunsky as The Head
Georgi Millyar as The Devil
Aleksei Smirnov
Mikhail Troyanovsky
Aleksandr Demyanenko

Soundtrack

External links 

 (English subtitles)

Soviet Christmas films
Soviet fantasy films
Soviet comedy films
1961 romantic comedy films
1961 films
1960s fantasy comedy films
1960s Russian-language films
Gorky Film Studio films
Films based on works by Nikolai Gogol
Films set in the 1770s
Films set in the Russian Empire
Films set in Saint Petersburg
Films set in Ukraine
Films shot in Saint Petersburg
Films directed by Aleksandr Rou
Russian comedy films
Russian children's fantasy films
1960s children's fantasy films
Films based on fairy tales
Works based on Christmas Eve (Gogol)
Soviet children's films